Larose is an unincorporated community and census-designated place (CDP) in Lafourche Parish, Louisiana, United States. The population was 6,763 in 2020. It is part of the Houma–Bayou Cane–Thibodaux metropolitan statistical area.

Geography
Larose is located in south-central Lafourche Parish at  (29.567328, -90.376074). It is bordered to the southeast by the community of Cut Off. Bayou Lafourche and the Gulf Intracoastal Waterway intersect in the center of Larose.

Louisiana Highways 1 and 308 run through Larose on opposite sides of Bayou Lafourche, Highway 1 to the south and Highway 308 to the north. Both highways lead northwest along Bayou Lafourche  to Lockport and southeast  to Golden Meadow. Louisiana Highway 3235, a four-lane bypass, leads southeast from Larose to Golden Meadow as well. Louisiana Highway 24 leads west from Larose  to Houma.

Demographics

As of the 2020 United States census, there were 6,763 people, 2,671 households, and 1,839 families residing in the CDP.

Government and infrastructure
The United States Postal Service operates the Larose Post Office.

Education
Lafourche Parish Public Schools operates public schools.
 North Larose Elementary School
 South Larose Elementary School
 Larose-Cut Off Middle School
South Lafourche High School is in nearby Galliano CDP and serves Larose.

In January 1916 the first public school in Larose, Larose Consolidated School, opened. In September 1950 the schools of Larose and Cut Off were consolidated into Larose-Cut Off High School. It was then consolidated with Golden Meadow High School to form South Lafourche High School in 1966.

Lafourche Parish Library operates the Larose Library.

Notable people
Ed Orgeron, head coach for the LSU Tigers football team
Bob Brunet, former player for the Washington Redskins

References

External links
 Larose-Cut Off Middle School
 North Larose Elementary School
 South Larose Elementary School

Census-designated places in Lafourche Parish, Louisiana
Census-designated places in Louisiana
Census-designated places in Houma – Thibodaux metropolitan area